Anthony Totten (born 11 February 1969)  is an Australian former professional rugby league footballer who played in the 1980s and 1990s.

He was born in Canterbury, New South Wales. A St. George junior from Bexley North, New South Wales, Anthony Totten appeared with the Sydney Roosters for two seasons between 1989-1991. He played 12 first grade games with the club, scored 6 tries and kicked 14 goals, scoring a total of 52 points for the club. He is listed as the Sydney Roosters 858th player.

References

Sydney Roosters players
Australian rugby league players
Living people
1969 births
Rugby league players from Sydney